Nueva Vizcaya's at-large congressional district, also known as Nueva Vizcaya's lone district, is the sole congressional district of the Philippines in the province of Nueva Vizcaya for various national legislatures since 1898. The province first elected its representative provincewide at-large for the Malolos Congress of the First Philippine Republic. In 1907 when the Philippine Assembly was established, the province had no representation as it was then classified as a special province under the supervision of the Department of the Interior Bureau of Non-Christian Tribes. Since 1916 when it was re-established as a specially organized province separate from its former Comandancia de Quiañgan which became the Ifugao sub-province under Jones Law, Nueva Vizcaya has been entitled to one member in the House of Representatives. It remains as a single-member district, except for a brief period between 1943 and 1944 when a second seat was allocated in the National Assembly of the Second Philippine Republic.

The district is currently represented by Luisa Lloren Cuaresma of the Lakas–CMD.

Representation history

Election results

2016

2013

2010

References

Congressional districts of the Philippines
Politics of Nueva Vizcaya
1898 establishments in the Philippines
1916 establishments in the Philippines
At-large congressional districts of the Philippines
Congressional districts of Cagayan Valley
Constituencies established in 1898